In enzymology, a 4-trimethylammoniobutyraldehyde dehydrogenase is an enzyme that catalyzes the chemical reaction

4-trimethylammoniobutanal + NAD+ + H2O  4-trimethylammoniobutanoate + NADH + 2 H+

The 3 substrates of this enzyme are 4-trimethylammoniobutanal, NAD+, and H2O, whereas its 3 products are 4-trimethylammoniobutanoate, NADH, and H+.

This enzyme belongs to the family of oxidoreductases, specifically those acting on the aldehyde or oxo group of donor with NAD+ or NADP+ as acceptor.  The systematic name of this enzyme class is 4-trimethylammoniobutanal:NAD+ 1-oxidoreductase. Other names in common use include 4-trimethylaminobutyraldehyde dehydrogenase, and 4-N-trimethylaminobutyraldehyde dehydrogenase.  This enzyme participates in lysine degradation and carnitine biosynthesis.

See also
Carnitine biosynthesis
γ-Butyrobetaine hydroxylase
Nε-Trimethyllysine hydroxylase

References

 

EC 1.2.1
NADH-dependent enzymes
Enzymes of unknown structure